Senator Vilas may refer to:

Joseph Vilas (1832–1905), Wisconsin State Senate
Levi Baker Vilas (1811–1879), Vermont State Senate
Martin S. Vilas (1870–1953), Vermont State Senate
William Freeman Vilas (1840–1908), U.S. Senator from Wisconsin from 1891 to 1897